Uris Buildings Corporation was a New York City commercial real estate development company created by Harold and Percy Uris in 1960 from a predecessor private partnership.  They retained 60% ownership in the corporation. One of the last buildings the brothers built together was the Uris Building housing the Uris Theater. Soon after Percy's death in 1971, Harold sold the corporation to National Kinney Corporation for $115 million, but the assets were soon foreclosed in the real estate market collapse of New York's 1973–75 recession.

History
Percy started the business in 1920 with his father Harris H. Uris (c. 1867–1945), a Lithuanian immigrant and former ornamental iron worker. The senior Uris, with his brothers, operated a large iron foundry that produced ornamental iron and included the New York City Subway among its clients. Percy graduated with a business degree from Columbia Business School in 1920, and went into partnership in 1925 after Harold graduated with a degree in civil engineering from Cornell. The brothers first focused on residential development, including emergency housing during World War II. They were successful during the 1920s and early 30s building numerous buildings in that time frame, but struggled during the great depression.

They resumed apartment construction in 1937 with 2 Sutton Place and 930 Fifth Avenue in 1939. Few other prominent New York City builders of the 1920s boom were still active after the war. They stopped building apartments in 1950, pulling out due to dissatisfaction with rent controls that were imposed during war but never discontinued. After that, they concentrated on commercial real estate development projects. They owned their developments personally until they incorporated in 1960 forming Uris Buildings, a public company. The offering of stock provide the financial capital for even larger projects.

By 1969, it was the largest publicly owned investment builder, with the brothers retaining 60% ownership.

Percy handled most financial aspects of the business, such as buying and selling property, negotiation of loans, financing, rental pricing, and profit calculation. Management of construction activity was primarily the realm of Harold. Uris frequently used Emery Roth & Sons as architect.

Projects outside of New York included the Hilton Hotel in Washington, DC that was built with five stories underground in order to have the desired space while conforming to the district's height restrictions. In Philadelphia, Uris built the first modern building in the city's central business district redevelopment known as Penn Center in 1953–1954.

The company was reported to be valued at over $600 million in 1972.

Uris Brothers developments were not architecturally imaginative or sophisticated. The company was focused on creating large profitable spaces at low cost. Famous real estate investor Harry Helmsley credits Uris with "having a profound effect on shaping the Park Avenue skyline above 45th Street".

Park Avenue

Under Park Avenue in New York City, north of 45th Street, is the Park Avenue Tunnel which carried the New York Central and New York, New Haven, & Hartford tracks through Manhattan to Grand Central Terminal. Buildings on Park Avenue near the terminal, in an area known as Terminal City, were successfully built over the tracks, which run in a double-deck subterranean steel structure, in the early 20th century.  Uris was the first to build in this manner post-war when it was much more challenging due to desire for much higher buildings, and much denser rail traffic which could not be interrupted during construction.

In 1955, Uris demolished an apartment building at 300 Park and replaced it with the glass and aluminum sheathed Colgate-Palmolive Building. The building was financially successful because analysis by structural engineer James Ruderman determined that some below-grade structural columns of the old building, which threaded through the track structure to bedrock  down, could be reused significantly reducing cost. The success of the project led Uris to purchase air rights over the tracks at 320 and 350 Park. Other developers soon followed and several more buildings were then built over the tracks.

Penn Center

In 1953, drawings for the Three Penn Center building, designed by Emery Roth & Sons, were released.  The design was viewed critically and called an "unremarkable twenty-story slab". Then Yale School of Architecture professor Louis Kahn said an architectural student would receive a failing grade for such a project. Arthur C. Kaufmann, CEO of Gimbels in Philadelphia and member of a Citizens' Advisory Committee for the project disavowed it.  Architectural Forum said it was "third-rate architecture". Uris ignored the criticism and proceeded with their plans. Mayor Joseph Clark said the building did not conform to the Penn Center plan and insisted that Uris submit the building plans for review by the city Art Commission. The Art Commission had authority over buildings in some parts of the city, but not Penn Center. Uris stalled and eventually said the structural steel had already been ordered so no changes were possible.

Three years later, while Three Penn Center was under construction, Uris released plans for Two Penn Center, its second building in the project. This building was considered as bad as the first building. The Board of Design realized Uris would not improve the aesthetics of the building unless forced and recommended changes to make the building more attractive. This building was under authority of the Art Commission due to its location near the scenic Benjamin Franklin Parkway. The Art Commission, who did not want to replicate the architecture of Three Penn Center, reached agreement with Uris that steel would not be ordered until the commission approved the plans. In spite of the agreement, Uris again claimed the steel was ordered and the design could not be changed.  The commission gave up trying to oppose Uris.

Media
The New Yorker published a cartoon on March 10, 1962, featuring a collage of scenes from construction sites captioned "Damn the Uris brothers, damn the Tishmans, damn Zeckendorf..."

Notable projects
Uris Brothers developed the following buildings either solely or jointly with others.

Gallery

References

External links
 Uris Brothers buildings at Emporis website

Companies based in New York City
Defunct real estate companies of the United States
American companies established in 1960
Real estate companies established in 1960
1960 establishments in New York City
1971 disestablishments in New York (state)
1971 mergers and acquisitions
American companies disestablished in 1971
Real estate companies disestablished in the 20th century
Former Time Warner subsidiaries